Zimmern ob Rottweil is a town in the district of Rottweil, in Baden-Württemberg, Germany. The municipality includes the former independent municipalities Zimmern ob Rottweil, Flözlingen, Horgen and Stetten ob Rottweil. Zimmern is located on a plateau over the upper Neckar valley, the villages Horgen, Stetten and Flözlingen are located in the Eschach valley.

Nearby towns and municipalities

The following towns and municipalities border Zimmern ob Rottweil:

Rottweil, Deißlingen, Niedereschach, Königsfeld im Schwarzwald, Eschbronn, Dunningen, Villingendorf

History
The first reference of Zimmern ob Rottweil dates back to 1275 AD, Flözlingen was mentioned for the first time in 779 AD, Horgen in 1306 AD, Setten ob Rottweil in 882 AD. There are archaeological proofs for Roman and Celtic settlements on the area of the contemporary municipality.

Notable people 
 Erwin Teufel (born 1939), German politician (CDU)

References

Rottweil (district)